Group A was one of the two groups of competing nations at the 2020 AFF Championship. It consisted of Thailand, Myanmar, the Philippines, hosts Singapore and Timor-Leste. The matches took place from 5 to 18 December 2021.

Thailand and Singapore, as the top two teams, advanced to the semi-finals.

Teams

Standings

Matches

Timor-Leste vs Thailand

Singapore vs Myanmar

Myanmar vs Timor-Leste

Philippines vs Singapore

Timor-Leste vs Philippines

Thailand vs Myanmar

Philippines vs Thailand

Singapore vs Timor-Leste

Thailand vs Singapore

Myanmar vs Philippines

References

Notes

External links
 Official Website

Group stage